Brooke Davis is a novelist and the author of the best selling novel Lost & Found (2014). She grew up in Bellbrae, Victoria. Davis currently resides in Perth, Western Australia.

Career and education 
Brooke Davis has worked as a travel writer, editor, and bookseller. Davis graduated with an honours degree from the University of Canberra (2004), winning the Allen & Unwin Prize for Prose Fiction, the Verandah Prose Prize, and the University Medal. Davis completed her PhD at Curtin University of Technology in 2013. During her time there, Davis received the 2009 Bobbie Cullen Memorial Award for Women Writers, the 2009 AAWP Prize for Best Postgraduate Paper, and the 2011 Postgraduate Queensland Writing Prize. Davis' thesis investigated how the process of grieving is represented in ways that deconstruct and resist the unspoken social mores that govern it. The creative component of Davis' PhD was  Lost & Found.
 
Davis' debut novel, Lost & Found (Hachette Australia, 2014), tells the story of three characters living on the South West coast of Western Australia. Davis was inspired to write the story after the sudden death of her mother in 2007. Described as 'whimsically humorous' and 'a potent mix of childlike wonder and world-weary experience', Davis' book sparked a bidding war at the 2014 London Book Fair, with rights being sold into 25 countries and translated into 20 languages.

In 2015 Lost & Found was awarded the ABIA General Fiction Book of the Year  and the Matt Richell Award for New Writer as well as being short-listed for Debut Fiction at the 2015 Indie Book Awards.

In July 2014 a documentary telling the story behind Davis’ journey as a writer aired  on ABC's Australian Story (Title: Driving Miss Davis).

Bibliography

 Future Brooke, Mothers and Others, Pan Macmillan Australia, 2015
 Lost & Found, Hachette Australia (2014), Windmill Books U.K (2015), Penguin RH Canada (2015)
 Karl the Touch Typist, Rex:The Journal of New Writing Vol. 3 No. 2 2011

Critical studies and reviews of Davis' work

Notable awards 

 2009 Bobbie Cullen Memorial Award for Women Writers
 2011 Postgraduate Queensland Writing Prize
 2014 iBooks Book of the Year
 2015 Matt Richell Award for New Writer
 2015 ABIA Winner Fiction Book of the Year for Lost & Found

References

External links 
 Author page for Brooke Davis
 ABC Online Article on Brooke Davis

Living people
21st-century Australian novelists
21st-century Australian women writers
Australian women novelists
Writers from Western Australia
1980 births
Australian travel writers
Women travel writers